Boali is a village in Sakhipur Upazila under Tangail District of the Division of Dhaka, Bangladesh.

Demographics
According to the 2011 Bangladesh census, Boali had 875 households and a population of 3,320.

Education
There is only one Degree College, one secondary school, one primary school, one Dakhil Madrasa. and a Hafizi Madrasha in the village.

List of Educational Institution
 Boali Degree College
 B.L.S. Chashi High School
 Boali Government Primary School
 Sabuj Bangla Girls Dakhil Madrasha
 Boali Hamius Sunnah Hafizia Madrasha

See also
 List of villages in Bangladesh

References

Villages in Tangail District